Macrocystidia is a genus of fungus in the mushroom family Marasmiaceae. The genus contains five species that collectively have a widespread distribution.

See also
List of Marasmiaceae genera

References

External links

Marasmiaceae
Agaricales genera